Desmond Hilton Patton  was the Archdeacon of Ossory and Leighlin from 1940 until 1951.

Ridgeway was educated at Trinity College, Dublin and ordained in 1901.  He began his career with curacies in Leicester and New Ross. He held Incumbencies in Gorey and  Carlow. He was Chancellor of St Laserian's Cathedral, Old Leighlin from 1933 to 1940.

References

Alumni of Trinity College Dublin
Archdeacons of Ossory and Leighlin
20th-century Irish Anglican priests